Misia may refer to:

 Misia (often stylized as MISIA) (born 1978), a Japanese R&B singer
 Mísia (born 1955), a Portuguese fado singer
 Misia Sert (1872–1950), a Polish-French pianist and influential patron of the arts in Paris
 Misia Furtak, a singer and musician

See also
 Mysia (disambiguation)
 Moesia
 Mizia